The 45th season of the Cuban National Series ended with another title for Industriales. Though the  Lions failed to win their division, they won close-fought series throughout the playoffs and won their 11th championship.

Regular season standings

West

East

Playoffs

References
 passim

Cuban National Series seasons
Base
Base
Cuba